Treskillard is a hamlet southeast of Camborne in west Cornwall, England, United Kingdom.

References

Hamlets in Cornwall